Sheffield is a census-designated place (CDP)  within Sheffield Township in southeastern Warren County, Pennsylvania, United States. It is named after Sheffield, England. The population was 1,123 at the 2010 census.

Geography
Sheffield is located at  (41.704246, -79.034022).

Demographics
As of the census of 2010, there were 1,123 people, 510 households, and 344 families residing in the CDP. The population density was 701.9 people per square mile (283.0/km2). There were 566 housing units at an average density of 327.4/sq mi (126.3/km2). The racial makeup of the CDP was 98.66% White, 0.39% African American, 0.08% Native American, 0.08% Asian, 0.32% from other races, and 0.47% from two or more races. Hispanic or Latino of any race were 0.63% of the population.

There were 510 households, out of which 30.4% had children under the age of 18 living with them, 52.5% were married couples living together, 11.8% had a female householder with no husband present, and 32.4% were non-families. 27.3% of all households were made up of individuals, and 14.1% had someone living alone who was 65 years of age or older. The average household size was 2.45 and the average family size was 2.96.

In the CDP, the population was spread out, with 24.6% under the age of 18, 6.9% from 18 to 24, 26.0% from 25 to 44, 24.8% from 45 to 64, and 17.6% who were 65 years of age or older. The median age was 40 years. For every 100 females, there were 92.7 males. For every 100 females age 18 and over, there were 87.5 males.

The median income for a household in the CDP was $36,307, and the median income for a family was $46,912. Males had a median income of $29,886 versus $18,750 for females. The per capita income for the CDP was $16,751. About 7.8% of families and 11.4% of the population were below the poverty line, including 18.1% of those under age 18 and 7.2% of those age 65 or over.

See also

 List of census-designated places in Pennsylvania

References

External links

 Sheffield, Warren County, Pennsylvania, 1895. Drawn by T. M. Fowler.

Census-designated places in Warren County, Pennsylvania
Census-designated places in Pennsylvania